Chinnamalai, translated in English as Little Mount, is a small hillock that lies on the bank of Adayar River in the Saidapet taluk of Chennai, Tamil Nadu, India. It is traditionally acknowledged to be one of the places where St. Thomas, an apostle of Jesus, lived and preached when he came to India. In 1551 AD, Portuguese built a Church over the site where St. Thomas is believed to have lived in. Later, in the year 1970, a part of this old Church was demolished and a larger circular Church was built to accommodate more devotees.

Little Mount now is a mixed-use residential and commercial area. The neighbourhood houses the IX Metropolitan Magistrates Court (Saidapet). Other Governmental offices located on the periphery of Little Mount include Raj Bhavan (the residence of the governor of Tamil Nadu), the headquarters of the state's Highways Department, and Panagal Maligai, which houses several government offices.

Current developments in and around Little Mount include the New Life Assembly of God (NLAG) Church, Checkers Hotel, Lemon Tree Hotel, and the Temple Steps office complex.

Little Mount is a stop on Line 1 of the Chennai Metro that runs between Washermanpet and the Airport.

St. Thomas 

St. Thomas is believed to have stayed in a tiny cave in Little Mount. He led a spartan prayerful life in solitude, often praying on the top of the hill and preaching to the local crowds that gathered to hear the Good news. The cave is well preserved and can be accessed from the old Church (chinna kovil) and is used for prayer and meditation by the devotees from all creeds. On the other side of the cave is an opening through which St. Thomas is said to have fled to escape this assailants. At the front of this opening are the hand and foot imprints of St. Thomas etched on the rock. A little farther away from the cave is an eternal spring from which is believed to be a work of St. Thomas. When St. Thomas was thirsty, he split the rocks and drank the refreshing water that gushed forth from the spring.

Shrine of apostle St Thomas and Our Lady of Health Church 

The Portuguese realized the importance of this sacred place and in 1551 AD, built a church in honor of Our Lady of Health. A part of this church still exists despite several renovations and development activities around it. The cave in which St. Thomas lived can be accessed from a small entrance at the left side of the altar of the church.

Developments around the church 
Recent developments in and around the church include developing a large tract of land behind the church as Holy Land. All stations of the cross and a few stations of rosary are built in concrete on this land. The altar at the Holy Land is said to have been  finished in Italy and blessed by the Pope before it was installed here.

New buildings in the Church campus include an adoration chapel, next to the old Church, a new parish office, at the other side of the circular Church, and a pulpit and altar to hold festival celebrations.

Church Festival 
The annual feast of Our Lady of Health is held on the fifth Saturday after Easter. It is preceded by flag hoisting nine days earlier and Novena. On each day, mass and prayers are offered for special intentions of a specific category of people. On the feast day, the high mass is followed by a car procession around the Church. Next evening, the flag is lowered after a high mass.

Status of the church 
Recently the church was elevated to the status of a Shrine. Now it is referred as "Shrine of Our Lady of Health." Masses are offered regularly (at 6:15 AM, 11:30 AM, and 6:00 PM during weekdays and (6:30 AM, 8:00 AM, 11:30 AM, and 5:00 PM during Sundays). During special occasions such as Christmas, masses are offered in two languages (Tamil and English). Every Sunday a mass is held in Korean at 10 am and an English mass at 6:30 pm.

Other organizations of the church

Our Lady of Health School 
This school was started with the purpose of providing education in English medium for the poor residents of the Little Mount parish. This school has only primary section and after fifth class students usually move on to other schools for continuing their education.

Immaculate Conception convent 
The Immaculate Conception (IC) convent is located behind the church and near the entrance to Holy Land.

Missionaries of Charity (Brothers) - Karunai Illam 
Karunai Illam provides a home for the destitute people who are differently disabled, both mentally and physically. It is run by brothers of Missionaries of Charity. Missionaries of Charity, Brothers was founded  in 1963 by Mother Teresa to do work similar to the Sisters of Missionaries of Charity.

Ozanam Health Center 
This health center was started at the initiative of Society of St. Vincent dePaul of Our Lady of Health Church. It was started at a time when common diseases were spreading among the poor people and doctors were difficult to find. It seeks to provide consultation and treatment to poor people for free or at nominal cost.

St. Thomas Community Hall 
A small non-airconditioned community hall was constructed by the Church for use by its parishioners. It is built over two floors and has a very small car park. The first floor can seat about 300 people and the dining ground floor can seat about 100. Cars are often parked outside the facility in the land belonging to Church. It is not available during the Church festival period.

Catholic graveyard 
A graveyard used for burying the dead parishioners is located near the newly constructed meetinghouse of the Church of Jesus Christ of Latter-day Saints.

New Life Assembly of God 

Rev. Dr. David Mohan is the senior pastor of the church. It is one of the biggest Assemblies of God congregation churches in Tamil Nadu, with nearly 55,000 people attending Sunday services in the church.
Rev. Dr. Chadwick Samuel, who is the eldest son of Pastor Mohan, serves the English congregation. The church is located across the Saidapet Bridge Junction connecting Rajbhavan Road towards Anna University, Adayar and GST Road Towards Guindy, Kathipara Junction.

Church of Jesus of Latter-day Saints 
There a meetinghouse for the Church of Jesus Christ of Latter-day Saints is under construction and is built over a property previously owned by Our Lady of Health Church.

Areas of Little Mount 
Little Mount includes several neighborhoods that were created during different periods. The Arokia Matha Nagar 1st & 2nd Street, LDG road, and Taluk office road  are probably the oldest neighborhoods. The Thomas Nagar, Srinagar Colony, Rangarajapuram, Bishop Colony were created much later.

Eat outs 
There are  many places to choose from. A landmark lower-middle-class place is Hotel Ashok Bhavan, on the Velacherry road. It serves good vegetarian food. Other places include Hotel Adyar Anantha Bhavan, Wangs Kitchen, French Loaf and Mount Palace. Sri Krishna Sweets near court. A Domino's Pizza outlet is located near the Halda junction. Hotel Ponnusamy has also opened an outlet just opposite the Domino's Pizza. Close by are five star hotels including Park Hyatt and the SRM hotel. There is a Lemon Tree hotel and a Cafe Coffee Day too.

MTC Bus Depot 
MTC set up the Saidapet bus depot on 08-03-74. It operates about 116 buses and services 107 routes.

Connectivity 
Little Mount is well connected by MTC bus services all round the clock. Several buses pass through Little Mount to various parts of city and even distant suburbs. In addition, there are several share autos that operate on short routes passing through Little Mount.

Little Mount is connected by Line 1 of the Chennai Metro which runs from Washermanpet to the Airport. The station is located between Guindy and Saidapet and is the first elevated station when heading towards the Airport.

References

External links 
Shrine of Apostle St Thomas & Our Lady of Health
 
 

Geography of Chennai
Religious buildings and structures completed in 1551
Thomas the Apostle
1551 in India